Francis Ford Wilson (29 October 1865 – 17 June 1919) was an Australian trade unionist and politician who served as a member of the Legislative Assembly of Western Australia from 1905 to 1908, representing the seat of North Perth.

Wilson was born near Creswick, Victoria. He worked variously as a blacksmith, wheelwright, and coachbuilder, living for periods in Melbourne and in Morwell. He served as president of the Victorian Coachbuilders' Union in 1901, and after moving to Western Australia in 1903 helped to re-establish a branch of the union there. At the 1904 state election, Wilson was elected to the seat of North Perth for the Labor Party, replacing George McWilliams. However, his time in parliament was short-lived, as he was defeated by James Brebber at the 1905 election. He later served on the North Perth Municipal Council from 1909 to 1914. In June 1919, Wilson contracted Spanish flu. He was placed into quarantine at Blackboy Hill, but died on the night of his arrival. Wilson had married Annie Andrew in 1887, with whom he had six children.

References

1865 births
1919 deaths
Australian trade unionists
Deaths from Spanish flu
Infectious disease deaths in Western Australia
Members of the Western Australian Legislative Assembly
People from Creswick, Victoria
Western Australian local councillors